The following article presents a summary of the 1978 football (soccer) season in Brazil, which was the 77th season of competitive football in the country.

Campeonato Brasileiro Série A

Quarterfinals

|}

Semifinals

|}

Final

Guarani declared as the Campeonato Brasileiro champions by aggregate score of 2-0.

State championship champions

Youth competition champions

Other competition champions

Brazilian clubs in international competitions

Brazil national team
The following table lists all the games played by the Brazil national football team in official competitions and friendly matches during 1978.

References

 Brazilian competitions at RSSSF
 1978 Brazil national team matches at RSSSF

 
Seasons in Brazilian football
Brazil